John Arthur Todd  (23 August 1908 – 22 December 1994) was an English mathematician who specialised in geometry.

Biography
He was born in Liverpool, and went up to Trinity College, Cambridge in 1925. He did research under H.F. Baker, and in 1931 took a position at the University of Manchester. He became a lecturer at Cambridge in 1937. He remained at Cambridge for the rest of his working life.

Work
The Todd class in the theory of the higher-dimensional Riemann–Roch theorem is an example of a characteristic class (or, more accurately, a reciprocal of one) that was discovered by Todd in work published in 1937. It used the methods of the Italian school of algebraic geometry. The Todd–Coxeter process for coset enumeration is a major method of computational algebra, and dates from a collaboration with H.S.M. Coxeter in 1936. In 1953 he and Coxeter discovered the Coxeter–Todd lattice. In 1954 he and G. C. Shephard classified the finite complex reflection groups.

Honours
In March 1948 he was elected a Fellow of the Royal Society.

Selected publications

 1936: "A practical method for enumerating cosets of a finite abstract group", Proc. Edin. Math. Soc. 5(1), 26-34 (with Harold Scott MacDonald Coxeter) 
 1937: "Rational quartic primals and associated Cremona transformations of four-dimensional space", Proc. London Math. Soc. s2-42, 324-339 (with Dennis Babbage), "The geometrical invariants of algebraic varieties", Proc. London Math. Soc. 43(2), 127-138, "The arithmetical invariants of algebraic loci", Proc. London Math. Soc. 43(2), 190-225
 1939: "The geometrical invariants of algebraic loci", Proc. London Math. Soc. 45, 410-424
 1953: "An extreme duodenary form", Can. J. Math. 5, 384-392 (with Harold Scott MacDonald Coxeter)
 1954: "Finite unitary reflection groups", Canadian Journal of Mathematics 6, 274-304 (with Geoffrey Colin Shephard)
 1960: "On complex Stiefel manifolds", Mathematical Proc. Camb. Phil. Soc. 56, 342-353 (with Michael Atiyah)
 1966: "A representation of the Mathieu group M24 as a collineation group", Ann. Mat. Pura Appl. 71(4), 199-238

References

External links
 Todd's Mactutor biography

1908 births
1994 deaths
Alumni of Trinity College, Cambridge
20th-century English mathematicians
Scientists from Liverpool
Fellows of Downing College, Cambridge
Fellows of the Royal Society